The Altenberg is the highest summit in the Limpurg Hills in southwest Germany, reaching a height of  and rising some 60 metres above the surrounding area. It lies east of Hohenberg, a village in the municipality of Sulzbach-Laufen, within the county of Schwäbisch Hall in the state of Baden-Württemberg.

Altenberg Tower 
At the summit is the Altenberg Tower, a 38.3-metre-high observation tower. The tower was opened on 7 October, 2007 and measures 36 metres from the ground to the observation platform. As a result, the fully covered viewing point is at a height of about 600 m.

Access 
 From the newly built visitor car park east of Hohenberg, a graveled path runs for a good 300 metres directly to the summit.
 A much longer and higher, but less steep path runs from the farm of Altenberg about 500 metres south of Hohenberg.
 In addition, various paths run from the east from the road between Hohenberg and Wegstetten as from the south from the Abtsklinge.

References

External links 

 Altenbergturm, at sulzbach-laufen.de via Internet Archive
 Topographic map with the Altenberg, in the geodata viewer at geoportal-bw.de
 360-degree panorama from the Altenberg Tower (Description of what's visible switchable), at panorama-photo.net

Limpurg Hills